Klum is a surname. Notable people with the surname include: 

Heidi Klum, German model
Johanna Klum, German TV personality
Mattias Klum, Swedish photographer and film producer
Otto Klum, American football coach

Fictional
Francis Klum, a comic book villain better known as the third Mysterio